Li Xingqi (born 2 August 2000) is a Chinese footballer currently playing as a defender for Wuhan Zall.

Club career
Li Xingqi would be promoted to the senior team of Wuhan Zall in the 2020 Chinese Super League campaign and he would go on to make his debut on 19 September 2020 in a Chinese FA Cup game against Hebei China Fortune F.C. that ended in a 1–1 draw, but was won in a penalty shootout.

Career statistics

References

External links

2000 births
Living people
Chinese footballers
Association football defenders
Wuhan F.C. players